Mwami is an honorific title common in parts of Central and East Africa.

Mwami may also refer to:

 Mwami, Zambia, a town in Zambia
 Mwami, Zimbabwe, a town in Zimbabwe

See also